José Domingo Sánchez (born 20 May 1911, date of death unknown) was a Colombian sprinter. He competed in the men's 100 metres at the 1936 Summer Olympics. He was also the flag bearer for Colombia at the 1936 Olympics.

References

External links
 

1911 births
Year of death missing
Athletes (track and field) at the 1936 Summer Olympics
Colombian male sprinters
Olympic athletes of Colombia
Place of birth missing